Jack Perkowski is  a Wall Street veteran, author, and the founder and Managing Partner of JFP Holdings, Ltd. He is also the former CEO and Chairman of the Board of ASIMCO Technologies, an automotive components company in China. He was one of the main characters in the Tim Clissold book, Mr. China, which detailed how  the private equity fund he ran invested over US$400 million into China as the country first opened up to foreign direct investment. The book chronicled the numerous ways the fund lost money. In the end, the fund lost almost all of its money.

Early life and education 
Originally from Pittsburgh, Pennsylvania,  Perkowski is a graduate of North Catholic High School. He attended Yale University on a football scholarship and received the Gordon Brown Memorial Prize, which is awarded each year to the outstanding member of the Junior Class. After graduating from Yale in 1970, he attended Harvard Business School, where he received an MBA degree with high distinction and was designated a Baker Scholar.

Career
Perkowski spent 21 years as an investment banker at Paine Webber, where he raised $300 million of equity for Paine Webber in the immediate aftermath of the stock market crash of October 19, 1987 known as Black Monday.

In 1994, Jack Perkowski founded ASIMCO, an automotive components company based in Beijing, China. Under Perkowski's leadership, ASIMCO was twice named one of the “Ten Best Employers in China,”ranking third, in the last survey conducted by Hewitt Associates and 21st Century Business Herald. In 2008, he was named one of "30 Outstanding Entrepreneurs in China's Auto Components Industry Over the Country's 30 Years of Economic Reform," by China Auto News, the only foreigner to receive such distinction.

In 2009, Jack Perkowski established JFP Holdings, a merchant bank for China, to help global companies develop and implement their China strategies and to assist Chinese companies develop global footprints.

Jack Perkowski was mentioned  in  The World Is Flat: A Brief History of the Twenty-first Century by journalist and Pulitzer Prize winning author Thomas Friedman. In 2008, he authored Managing the Dragon: How I’m Building a Billion Dollar Business in China, published by Crown Business.

Periodically, Perkowski contributes to the Morning Whistle newspaper owned by 21st Century Media.

Bibliography
Managing the Dragon: How I’m Building a Billion Dollar Business in China (Crown Business;  2008)

References

External links
Managing the Dragon
JFP Holdings website

Living people
Economy of China
Harvard Business School alumni
American male writers
Yale University alumni
American chief executives
Year of birth missing (living people)